Poilcourt-Sydney is a commune in the Ardennes department in northern France. It is named after the City of Sydney in Australia.

Population

See also
Communes of the Ardennes department

References

Communes of Ardennes (department)
Ardennes communes articles needing translation from French Wikipedia